is a Japanese football player. She is currently playing as a defender for Sanfrecce Hiroshima Regina in the WE League. She previously played for the Japan women's national football team, winning a World Cup and an Olympic silver medal before her international retirement in 2016.

Club career

In Japan until 2013
Kinga was born in Yokohama on 2 May 1984. After graduating from high school, she joined Nippon TV Beleza in 2003 where she played as attacking midfielder and right-winger. In the 2003 season, she was given the Nadeshiko League's Best Young Player award. During her time at Nippon TV Beleza, the club won the Nadeshiko League championship 5 times. In 2011, she moved to INAC Kobe Leonessa with international players Homare Sawa, Shinobu Ohno and Chiaki Minamiyama due to financial strain at the club. At INAC Kobe Leonessa, the club won the Nadeshiko League championship for 3 years in a row (2011–2013). She was selected to the league's Best XI for 6 years in a row (2007–2012).

In January 2014, INAC's general manager revealed that Kinga had agreed to join English FA WSL club Arsenal Ladies and in February she officially signed the contract. At Arsenal, Kinga helped propel the club to reach the final of the 2014 FA Women's Cup which they won in a 2–0 margin over Everton.

She re-signed with INAC Kobe in early 2015. In 2016, she began playing in the Australian W-League for Canberra United. In October 2017, Kinga joined defending W-League champions Melbourne City. In February 2019, she returned to Japan and joined Orca Kamogawa FC. In October 2019, Kinga re-signed with Melbourne City. In February 2020, it was announced that Kinga would re-sign with Orca Kamogawa at the end of the 2019–20 W-League season.

National team career
In August 2002, Kinga was selected by the Japan U-20 women's national team for the 2002 FIFA U-19 Women's World Championship. On 29 March 2005, she debuted for the Japan women's national team against Australia. She was playing as an attacking midfielder and right-winger until 2007, when she was converted to rightback by manager Hiroshi Ohashi. After she converted her position, she became a regular player in the Japan national team. Japan won the 2011 World Cup in which Kinga played in the final, came second in the 2015 World Cup and earned a silver medal in the 2012 Summer Olympics. She played 100 games and scored 5 goals for Japan until her retirement in 2016.

Club statistics

National team statistics

Honors

International career
Japan
 Summer Olympics: Silver Medal: 2012
 FIFA Women's World Cup: Champion: 2011
 Asian Games: Gold Medal: 2010
 East Asian Football Championship: Champions: 2008, 2010

Club
Nippon TV Beleza
L.League:Champion (5): 2005, 2006, 2007, 2008, 2010
 
INAC Kobe
L.League:Champion (3): 2011, 2012, 2013

Nippon TV Beleza
Empress's Cup: Champion (5): 2004, 2005, 2007, 2008, 2009

INAC Kobe
Empress's Cup: Champion (3): 2011, 2012, 2013

Nippon TV Beleza
Nadeshiko League Cup: Champion (2): 2007, 2010

INAC Kobe
Nadeshiko League Cup: Champion (1): 2012

Arsenal
FA Women's Cup: 2014

Individual
L.League: Best 11 (6): 2007, 2008, 2009, 2010, 2011, 2012
L.League: Best Young Player: 2003
Nadeshiko League Cup: MVP: 2007

References

External links

Japan Football Association

1984 births
Living people
Nippon Sport Science University alumni
Association football people from Kanagawa Prefecture
Japanese women's footballers
Japan women's international footballers
Nadeshiko League players
Women's Super League players
A-League Women players
Nippon TV Tokyo Verdy Beleza players
INAC Kobe Leonessa players
Arsenal W.F.C. players
Canberra United FC players
Melbourne City FC (A-League Women) players
Orca Kamogawa FC players
Japanese expatriate women's footballers
Expatriate women's footballers in England
Japanese expatriate sportspeople in England
FIFA Women's World Cup-winning players
2007 FIFA Women's World Cup players
2011 FIFA Women's World Cup players
2015 FIFA Women's World Cup players
Olympic footballers of Japan
Olympic silver medalists for Japan
Olympic medalists in football
Medalists at the 2012 Summer Olympics
Footballers at the 2008 Summer Olympics
Footballers at the 2012 Summer Olympics
Asian Games medalists in football
Asian Games gold medalists for Japan
Medalists at the 2010 Asian Games
Footballers at the 2010 Asian Games
FIFA Century Club
Women's association football defenders
Women's association football midfielders
Sportspeople from Yokohama
Sanfrecce Hiroshima Regina players
Expatriate women's soccer players in Australia
Expatriate women's association footballers in New Zealand
Japanese expatriate sportspeople in Australia
Japanese expatriate sportspeople in New Zealand